This is a list of wars of the country of Maldives .

Wars involving the Maldives
Maldives
Military history of the Maldives
Wars